Nicholas Folk Dupree (February 23, 1982 – February 18, 2017) was an American disability rights activist and writer. His campaign labeled "Nick's Crusade" resulted in a special program for 30 ventilator-dependent Alabamians (including himself and his younger brother) to continue home care after they turn 21 years old.

Early life
He was born in Morgantown, West Virginia, on February 23, 1982, with mitochondrial disease. Despite the disease, he was able to go to school by himself, feed himself, and use a manual wheelchair for several years into his childhood. On September 13, 1991, an infected surgical site during a Luque rods surgery triggered a collapse that killed Dupree's remaining muscle tone.

In October 1991 he got his first feeding tube, and he first began using a non-invasive BiPAP ventilator to breathe in February 1992. In 1994, due to respiratory failure, Dupree underwent a tracheostomy and began using a ventilator to breathe at all times.

Dupree was admitted to Spring Hill College in Mobile, Alabama, at age 16.

Nick's Crusade
Dupree organized "Nick's Crusade", a campaign which attempted to gain continued in-home services for Alabamians with disabilities who are over the age of 21. On February 10, 2003, United States Department of Health and Human Services secretary Tommy Thompson announced a limited program in Alabama that would fund in-home services for Dupree and 29 others who were turning 21 shortly.

Personal life
Dupree lived in New York City since 2008 with his partner Alejandra Ospina, who is also a disability rights activist. In 2010, the couple held a public commitment ceremony in New York's Central Park, conducted in part to dramatize concern that people with disabilities are dissuaded from marrying because of U.S. government rules that could cause them to lose disability benefits if they were married. He enjoyed writing, and was working on his memoir.

He was a prolific webcomic artist who self-published a variety of comics in different styles. He also enjoyed creating self-portraits, along with portraits of family and friends, some of which were exhibited publicly in New York City.

He was also active on podcaster Dan Carlin's message boards. In honor of him, Carlin made an episode about healthcare.

Dupree had an unknown muscular disorder believed to be related to the metabolic cycle and carnitine. Due to his disability, he depended on a ventilator to breathe, and used a wheelchair, though he was often bedbound. He worked, created art, and communicated via the computer by using his thumb on a trackball mouse. He clicked out text on the computer screen using KeyStrokes, an on-screen keyboard.

Death
Dupree died on February 18, 2017. He had spent the last 9.5 months of his life living in hospital and nursing home environments, which he had always sought to avoid as part of his personal advocacy. He developed sepsis and suffered cardiac failure after many months of facility-acquired infections.

References

External links
Nick's Crusade official website
Superdude Comics by Nick Dupree

1982 births
2017 deaths
Activists from West Virginia
American disability rights activists
People from Morgantown, West Virginia
Wheelchair users